The bighead sculpin (Batrachocottus baicalensis) is a species of sculpin fish that is endemic to the Lake Baikal watershed in Siberia, Russia. Its colour varies from grayish to brownish or greenish depending on the bottom type. It feeds on a wide range of smaller animals such as young fish, insect larvae, amphipods, molluscs and oligochaetes. Breeding is in the spring where the female lays 618 to 1622 eggs, which are guarded by the male.

The bighead sculpin is variously considered to belong either to the family Cottocomephoridae, Cottidae or Abyssocottidae.

References

Cottidae
Fish described in 1874
Fish of Lake Baikal